Kingston Heath Golf Club is one of the premier golf clubs in Australia, located in Cheltenham, Victoria. The course is situated on the sandbelt region in the southeast suburbs of Melbourne famed for its golf courses, with Kingston Heath consistently ranked in the top 3 courses in Australia and top 20 courses in the world.

The club has hosted many major events, including 7 x Men's Australian Opens, 1 x Women's Australian Open, 7 x Victorian Opens, 2 x Australian Masters and the 2016 World Cup of Golf. The Men's Australian Open was scheduled to return to Kingston Heath in 2020 but was cancelled due to the COVID-19 pandemic.

History

Elsternwick Park (1909 - 1925)

Kingston Heath was originally formed as the Elsternwick Golf Club in 1909, and was based at present day Elsternwick Park. In 1920, the committee discussed a relocation to the South-Eastern suburbs of Melbourne. This area would become world famous as the Melbourne Sandbelt.

Cheltenham (1925 - present)

The club relocated to its present location in Cheltenham in 1925. This move included the complete dismantling, moving and re-assembling of the original clubhouse to the new site. The club officially opened in April 1925, and was renamed Kingston Heath 5 months later.

Course

The current course was designed by Dan Soutar and was constructed by M.A Morcom. Originally, it played as a par 82 and at the time was the longest course in Australia. Its founders were of the opinion that it was easier to shorten the course rather than to lengthen it. The original scorecard read as below:

Advice was sought from Alister MacKenzie during his visit to Australia in 1926, who provided a suitable bunkering strategy for the course. Although many link MacKenzie to the actual design of Kingston Heath, his only course routing input was to change the 15th hole. This was a short par 4 (222 yards) which played as a blind tee shot over a hill before descending to the green. MacKenzie's recommendation was to shorten the hole, bringing the green to the top of the rise and becoming a tricky, uphill par 3. Work commenced soon after, with the newly rated par 3 15th becoming one of the most recognisable holes in Australian golf, and Kingston Heath's signature hole.

Over the years, the par of the course has gradually dropped, now playing as a par 72 for Men and 74 for Women.

In 2002, the club constructed a 19th hole - a par 3 positioned between the 1st green and 2nd tee. This hole was designed to championship specifications, allowing the club to insert it into the course rotation during times of required maintenance of another hole. The 19th has since become a fixture in the club's "Tournament" course, often replacing the 10th hole in major events.

An interesting feature of the course is the adaptability in producing different layouts. Given it does not allow a traditional "9 out, 9 in" layout as many courses of its stature do, an alternative was required for the hosting of major events. The introduction of the 19th hole assisted in allowing the club to produce a more tournament friendly layout, known as the "Inner and Outer" course, routing players through the 9 inner most holes of the property as the front 9, returning them to the clubhouse after 9 holes. They then play the 9 outer most holes of the property as the back 9, allowing them to finish on the 18th hole.

Course Records
Professional
 (Men) Mark Brown: 62 (-10), during Round 2 of The Open IFQ, 2013
 (Women) Karrie Webb & Jiyai Shin: 67 (-6), both recorded during the final round of the 2008 MFS Women's Australian Open

Amateur
 (Men) Cruze Strange: 63 (-9), during the 2011 Port Phillip Amateur Championship
 (Women) Stephanie Kyriacou: 66 (-8), during the 2017 Port Phillip Amateur Championship

Championships

Professional Events

Australian Open: 7
1948, 1957, 1970, 1983, 1989, 1995, 2000

Women's Australian Open: 1
2008

World Cup of Golf: 1
2016

Australian Masters: 2
2009, 2012

Victorian Open: 7
1958, 1969, 1976, 1979, 1987, 1988, 1989

Australian Match Play Championship: 7
1986, 1987, 1988, 1989, 1990, 1991, 1992

The Open Championship International Final Qualifying 

Kingston Heath was the preferred Australian venue of the R&A for the staging of International Final Qualifying for The Open Championship, which was held each January from 2004 to 2013.

Amateur Events 

Australian Men's Amateur Championship: 1
1963

 Australian Women's Amateur Championship: 2
 1952, 1996

Course Ranking

The course is consistently ranked within the top 3 courses in Australia. It also regularly features in publications such as Golf Digest and Golf Magazine in their "World's Top 100 Golf Courses" lists, which has seen Kingston Heath hold a position in the Top 20 for a number of years.

References

External links

Kingston Heath Golf Club Profile, Golf Australia

Golf clubs and courses in Victoria (Australia)
Golf clubs and courses designed by Alister MacKenzie
Sporting clubs in Melbourne
Sports venues in Melbourne
1925 establishments in Australia
Sport in the City of Kingston (Victoria)
Buildings and structures in the City of Kingston (Victoria)